Uzma Gillani (born 1947) is a veteran Pakistani television actress and advertiser. She along with Khalida Riyasat, Tahira Naqvi and Roohi Bano dominated the television screens of Pakistan during 1970s, 1980s and 1990s.

Early life
Uzma was born in Meerut, British India and her parents migrated to Pakistan.

Career
Uzma is known for her tough nature and autocratic choice of roles, she is considered to be one of the greatest television actors of all time in Pakistan. Uzma began her career through PTV's most successful plays Waris (1979–1982), Nasheman (1982), Dehleez (1981) and Panah (1981) which earned her widespread acclaim and recognition and a Pride of Performance Award by the President of Pakistan in 1982.

Uzma Gillani also battled successfully with cancer in her life. With her career spanning over forty-five years, she is one of the early TV actresses that gained fame when television came into Pakistan in 1964.

Personal life
Uzma married Inayat Shah Gillani who died in 2017 and she has two children.

Filmography

Television series
 Panah (1981) (subject was the Afghan war and the refugees)
 Waris (1979–1982)
 Badlon Par Basera
 Doosra Kinara
 Manzil Hai Kahan
 Dehleez (1981)
 Neelay Hath (1989)
 Maa
 Man-o-Salwa (2007)
 Firaaq (2014)
 Maryam(2015)
 Shehr-e-Ajnabi (2014)
 Amar Bail (TV One)
 Tujh Pe Qurban
 Nasheman
 Masuri
 Kinara Mil Gaya Hota
 Ishq Atish
 Chahtain
 Taar-e-Ankaboot
 Alao
 Punkh
 Shaam Sey Phelay
 Dastar-e-Ana (2017)
 Kaisa Hai Naseeban (2019)
 Bhool (2019)

Film
 Sacch (2019) as Uzma

Honour
The Government of Pakistan named a street and intersection after her in Lahore on August 16th, 2021. In 2022 on May 19th the Cantonment Board of Bahawalpur (CBB) named a Park after her called Uzma Gillani Park for children and women in Model Town.

Awards and recognition

References

External links
 
 , Uzma Gillani on IMDb website
 

1947 births
20th-century Pakistani actresses
Living people
Pakistani television actresses
Pakistani film actresses
21st-century Pakistani actresses
PTV Award winners
Recipients of the Pride of Performance
Muhajir people
People from Meerut